The Band Perry EP is a 5-song extended play released from country music group The Band Perry. The extended play is the group's first release on Republic Nashville. It was released on April 6, 2010, and debuted at No. 46 on the U.S. Billboard Top Country Albums chart the following week as well as No. 37 on the Top Heatseekers chart. It features their debut single, "Hip to My Heart", which was a Top 20 hit on the Hot Country Songs charts. Also included is "If I Die Young", which was released as their second single. It has also become their first entry on the Billboard Hot 100.

All songs from the EP later appeared on the band's self-titled debut album.

Critical reception
Matt Bjorke of Roughstock gave the extended play a rating of 4 out of 5, stating that "Hip to My Heart" was infectious, however the rest of the album doesn't feel like anything "hip". He also said while not every song is going to hit, their talent is there to raise even the ‘lowest’ song up to something interesting and worthy of listening to.

Track listing

Chart performance
The Band Perry — EP debuted at No. 46 on the U.S. Billboard Top Country Albums chart and No. 37 on the Top Heatseekers chart following its release in April 2010. As of September 2010, it has peaked at No. 32 on the U.S. Billboard Top Country Albums chart and #4 on the U.S. Billboard Top Heatseekers chart.

References

2010 debut EPs
The Band Perry EPs
Republic Records EPs
Albums produced by Nathan Chapman (record producer)
Albums produced by Paul Worley